Faggen is a municipality in the Landeck district in the Austrian state of Tyrol located 10.5 km south of Landeck at the entrance of the Kauner Valley which is a side valley on the upper course of the Inn River.

It has six hamlets and is very weak in structure. The main source of income is „gentle“ agriculture but many inhabitants are commuters because there are hardly jobs.

References

External links

Cities and towns in Landeck District